Floyd Daniel Hargiss (September 28, 1890 – August 27, 1974) was an American football coach.  He was the sixth head football coach at Ottawa University in Ottawa, Kansas and he held that position for the 1912 season.  His coaching record at Ottawa was 1–5.
  Hargiss was the brother of Homer Woodson Hargiss.

References

1890 births
1974 deaths
Basketball coaches from Kansas
Ottawa Braves football coaches
Ottawa Braves basketball coaches
People from Cherokee County, Kansas